The Summer Camp Music Festival is a multi-day music festival created by Jay Goldberg Events & Entertainment and held annually on Memorial Day Weekend at Three Sisters Park in Chillicothe, Illinois. The event typically attracts around 20,000 visitors, of which between 8,000 and 10,000 arrive before gates open. In 2014, it was listed as one of the top 40 music festivals in Rolling Stone.

Soulpatch
Soulpatch is a long-term, interactive garden space at Three Sisters Park.  Experts have been providing education and answer questions about gardening at Summer Camp since 2014.

Annual history

2001
The first annual Summer Camp Music Festival was held June 23–24, 2001.

Line up, among others

2002
The second annual Summer Camp Music Festival was held July 5–7, 2002.

Line up, among others

2003
The third annual Summer Camp Music Festival was held May 24–26, 2003. This year marked the first time Umphrey's McGee began playing at Summer Camp.

Line up, among others

 Drums & Tuba
 JACD w/ Johnny Neel and Derico Watson
 Umphrey's McGee
 Particle
 Karl Denson's Tiny Universe
 moe.
 Two Cow Garage
 Marc Broussard
 Donna the Buffalo
 The New Deal
 Oteil and the Peacemakers
 Keller Williams

2004
The fourth annual Summer Camp Music Festival was held May 28–30, 2004. This year, the festival expanded to 35 bands.

 Line up, among others

 Particle
 Umphrey's McGee
 Medeski Martin & Wood
 Leftover Salmon
 moe.
 New Monsoon
 Tea Leaf Green
 Jeff Austin (of Yonder Mountain String Band)
 Family Groove Company
 Jim Donovan (of Rusted Root)

 Benevento Russo
 Antigone Rising
 Oteil and the Peacemakers
 Jazz Mandolin Project featuring Jon Fishman
 Keller Williams
 moe.
 Charlie Hunter Trio
 RAQ
 Mofro
 Jim Donovan (of Rusted Root)

2005
The fifth annual Summer Camp Music Festival was held May 26–29, 2005. This year featured over 40 bands.

Line up, among others

 New Monsoon
 RAQ
 Particle
 Donna the Buffalo
 Keller Williams
 moe.
 Euforquestra
 Backyard Tire Fire
 Michael Franti & Spearhead
 Umphrey's McGee
 Hot Buttered Rum String Band
 Mofro
 The Hackensaw Boys
 Family Groove Company
 The Reverend Peyton's Big Damn Band
 Oteil and the Peacemakers
 Jazz Mandolin Project
 Victor Wooten Band
 Jeff Coffin Mutet
 Umphrey's McGee
 Jazz Mandolin Project with *Oteil and the Peacemakers

2006
The sixth annual Summer Camp Music Festival was held May 25–27, 2006.

 moe.
 Umphrey's McGee
 Keller Williams
 Rusted Root
 Yonder Mountain String Band
 The Disco Biscuits
 Honkytonk Homeslice featuring Billy Nershi
 Andrew Bird
 Oteil and the Peacemakers
 Zilla featuring Michael Travis
 Chris Berry & Panjea featuring Michael Kang
 Apollo Sunshine
 New Monsoon
 ALO (Animal Liberation Orchestra)
 Vince Herman
 Tea Leaf Green
 RAQ
 Rose Hill Drive
 Pnuma Trio
 Glenn Kotche (of Wilco)
 The Lee Boys
 Backyard Tire Fire
 Reverend Peyton's Big Damn Band
 The Brakes
 Family Groove Company
 Brothers Past 
 The Steepwater Band
 Future Rock

2007
The seventh annual Summer Camp Music Festival was held May 24–27, 2007.

Line up, among others

 Tea Leaf Green
 Assembly of Dust
 ALO (Animal Liberation Orchestra)
 Keller Williams and the WMDs
 Umphrey's McGee
 moe.
 Family Groove Company
 Reverend Peyton's Big Damn Band
 Assembly of Dust
 Oteil and the Peacemakers
 The Brakes
 Great American Taxi
 Les Claypool
 Pnuma Trio
 Al and the Transamericans
 Toubab Krewe
 Melissa Ferrick
 New Monsoon
 Galactic
 Medeski Martin & Wood
 Brothers Past
 The Wood Brothers
 Hot Buttered Rum
 Backyard Tire Fire

 Tag Team - Constantly changing band composed of members of Umphrey's McGee, Moe, and Tea Leaf Green. Band members would "tag" each other when they wanted to switch out with someone playing on stage.

2008

The 2008 Summer Camp Music Festival was held May 23–25.

 moe.
 Umphrey's McGee
 The Flaming Lips
 O.A.R.
 The Roots
 G. Love & Special Sauce
 The New Pornographers
 STS9
 George Clinton & Parliament Funkadelic
 Tea Leaf Green
 Clutch
 Blind Melon
 Girl Talk
 The Avett Brothers
 Cornmeal
 Hot Buttered Rum
 The Lee Boys
 Lotus
 Family Groove Company
 Euforquestra
 Future Rock
 Banyan
 Moon Taxi
 Backyard Tire Fire

2009
The 2009 Summer Camp Music Festival was held May 21–24, 2009.

Line up, among others

 moe.
 Umphrey's McGee
 Willie Nelson
 Method Man & Redman
 Keller Williams
 Les Claypool
 Medeski Scofield Martin & Wood
 Girl Talk
 Gomez
 Darkstar Orchestra
 Los Lobos
 Buckethead
 Lotus
 Bassnectar
 That 1 Guy
 The Wood Brothers
 EOTO
 Cornmeal
 Junior Brown
 Family Groove Company
 Assembly of Dust
 Easy Star All Stars
 Backyard Tire Fire
 Moonalice
 Toubab Krewe
 Brainchild
 The Bridge
 Secret Chiefs 3
 Public Property
 Greensky Bluegrass
 Yamn

2010
The 10th annual Summer Camp Music Festival was held May 28–30, 2010.

Line up, among others

 moe.
 Umphrey's McGee
 Sound Tribe Sector Nine
 Gov't Mule
 The Avett Brothers
 Keller Williams
 Slightly Stoopid
 Backyard Tire Fire
 Family Groove Company
 Bassnectar
 G. Love & Special Sauce
 Rebelution
 Split Lip Rayfield
 That 1 Guy
 The Bridge
 EOTO
 Cornmeal
 Zappa Plays Zappa
 Pretty Lights
 Steel Pulse
 Victor Wooten
 Railroad Earth
 Future Rock
 Animal Liberation Orchestra
 The Hood Internet
 The New Mastersounds
 Dumpstaphunk
 Hot Buttered Rum
 My Dear Disco
 Kinetix
 The Ragbirds
 Zach Deputy
 Dangermuffin

2011
The 11th annual Summer Camp Music Festival was held May 27–29, 2011.

Line up, among others

 moe.
 Umphrey's McGee
 Widespread Panic
 STS9
 Bassnectar
 The Avett Brothers
 Girl Talk
 Yonder Mountain String Band
 Bela Fleck & The Flecktones
 Bruce Hornsby & the Noisemakers
 Keller Williams
 Slightly Stoopid
 Wiz Khalifa
 Skrillex
 EOTO
 Cornmeal
 Big Gigantic
 SOJA
 7 Walkers
 The Wood Brothers
 The New Mastersounds
 Tea Leaf Green
 Mimosa
 BoomBox
 Daedelus
 Family Groove Company
 Future Rock
 The Werks
 Gaelic Storm
 Greensky Bluegrass
 Rebirth Brass Band
 The Mother Hips
 The Pimps of Joytime
 Ryan Montbleau Band
 Paper Diamond
 The Ragbirds
 Orgone
 Euforquestra
 The Reverend Peyton's Big Damn Band
 My Dear Disco
 Dirtfoot
 Truth & Salvage Co.
 Keys N Krates
 The Giving Tree Band
 Van Ghost

2012
The 12th annual Summer Camp Music Festival was held May 25–27, 2012.

Line up, among others

 moe.
 Umphrey's McGee
 Jane's Addiction
 Pretty Lights
 Primus
 Common
 Gov't Mule
 Tedeschi Trucks Band
 Gogol Bordello
 Zeds Dead
 Michael Franti & Spearhead
 Yonder Mountain String Band
 Shpongle
 EOTO
 Keller Williams
 Rebelution
 Leftover Salmon
 Galactic
 Cornmeal
 12th Planet
 Ozomatli
 Victor Wooten
 Sierra Leone's Refugee All Stars
 Preservation Hall Jazz Band
 BoomBox
 Gaelic Storm
 Devil Makes Three
 Dirty Dozen Brass Band
 Future Rock
 Greensky Bluegrass
 Kids These Days
 The Infamous Stringdusters
 Gramatik
 Anders Osborne
 Orgone
 Hot Buttered Rum
 Family Groove Company
 The Ragbirds
 Sister Sparrow & the Dirty Birds
 AraabMuzik
 The Lumineers
 Rubblebucket
 Van Ghost
 DJ Solo
 JC Brooks & the Uptown Sound
 Red Wanting Blue
 Banyan
 Flinch
 Stratus
 Kinetix
 The Giving Tree Band
 Chester Brown
 Tauk
 David Gans
 Caravan of Thieves
 Tribal Seeds
 Elsinore
 The Steepwater Band
 Mathien

2013
The 13th annual Summer Camp Music Festival was held on May 24–26, 2013.

Line up, among others

 moe.
 Umphrey's McGee
 Trey Anastasio Band
 STS9
 The Avett Brothers
 Thievery Corporation
 Zeds Dead
 Big Gigantic
 Yonder Mountain String Band
 Medeski Martin & Wood
 Diplo
 EOTO
 Big Boi
 Gramatik
 Paper Diamond
 North Mississippi Allstars
 The Wailers
 Cornmeal
 Lettuce
 Future Rock
 Victor Wooten
 Dumpstaphunk
 The M Machine
 Savoy
 Alvin Risk
 The Wood Brothers
 Tokimonsta
 Tea Leaf Green
 Van Ghost
 The Soul Rebels
 John Brown's Body
 Maps and Atlases
 Minnesota
 Everyone Orchestra
 Liquid Stranger
 Family Groove Company
 The Werks
 Cherub
 Giant Panda Guerilla Dub Squad
 Filligar
 The Reverend Peyton's Big Damn Band
 The Giving Tree Band
 Caravan of Thieves
 The Ragbirds
 Gangstagrass
 The 4onthefloor
 Roster McCabe
 Miss A
 Tauk
 Aqueous
 Swear and Shake
 James Wallace & the Naked Light

2014
The 14th annual Summer Camp Music Festival was held on May 23–25, 2014.

Line up, among others

 moe.
 Umphrey's McGee
 Zac Brown Band
 Bassnectar
 Trey Anastasio Band
 Primus
 Slightly Stoopid
 Girl Talk
 Yonder Mountain String Band
 Lotus
 Gramatik
 Wolfgang Gartner
 EOTO
 Blues Traveler
 Matisyahu
 G. Love & Special Sauce
 Wild Adriatic
 Lettuce
 Everyone Orchestra
 Beats Antique
 Bro Safari
 The M Machine
 Victor Wooten Band
 Future Rock
 Koan Sound
 Blackberry Smoke
 The Devil Makes Three
 Greensky Bluegrass
 Cherub
 The Wood Brothers
 Groundation
 The Motet
 Family Groove Company
 Green Lantern
 Dawn of Midi
 Orgone
 The Ragbirds
 Van Ghost
 Brainchild
 Swear and Shake
 The London Souls
 Funk Trek
 Filibusta

2015
The 15th annual Summer Camp Music Festival was held on May 22–24, 2015.

Line up, among others

 moe.
 Umphrey's McGee
 Steve Miller Band
 Widespread Panic
 Sound Tribe Sector 9
 Big Gigantic
 John Butler Trio
 Paul Oakenfold
 Cherub
 Future Rock
 The Infamous Stringdusters
 Joe Russo's Almost Dead
 Trampled By Turtles
 American Aquarium
 Family Groove Company
 KOA
 North American Scum
 Trigger Hippy
 Turnpike Troubadors

2016
The 16th annual Summer Camp Music Festival was held on May 27–29, 2016.

Line up, among others

moe.
Umphrey's McGee
Pretty Lights
Trey Anastasio
Zeds Dead
Primus
Gov't Mule
Run the Jewels
Disco Biscuits
gramatik
Mike Gordon
The Claypool Lennon Delirium
Lil Dicky
Lotus
Louis the Child
NGHTMRE
Sam Feldt
Savoy
Snails
The Wailers
Filibusta
Liquid Stranger
Manic Focus
Mija
The Russ Liquid Test
Sunsquabi
Twiddle
The Werks
Tauk

2017
The 17th annual Summer Camp Music Festival was held on May 26–28, 2017.

Line up, among others

moe.
Umphrey's McGee
Pretty Lights
Trey Anastasio
Zeds Dead
A Tribe Called Red
Waka Flocka
Primus
Gov't Mule
Run the Jewels
Disco Biscuits
gramatik
Mike Gordon
The Claypool Lennon Delirium
Destructo
EOTO
Everyone Orchestra
The Floozies
Ganja White Night
GTA
Herobust
Hippie Sabotage
The Infamous Stringdusters
Keller Williams Kwhatro
Kyle Hollingsworth Band
Laith Al-Saadi
Manic Focus
Nahko and Medicine for the People
Railroad Earth
Rezz
Slander

2018
The 18th annual Summer Camp Music Festival was held on May 24–27, 2018.

 Line up, among others

 moe.
 Umphrey's McGee
 Phil Lesh and the Terrapin Family Band
 Diplo
 Slightly Stoopid
 Cypress Hill
 STS9
 Tipper
 RL Grime
 Tycho
 Greensky Bluegrass
 Action Bronson
 Beats Antique
 Cherub
 EOTO
 Everyone Orchestra
 Guster
 Jai Wolf
 JJ Grey & Mofro
 John Medeski's Mad Skillet
 Keller Williams
 Keys N Krates
 Kyle Hollingsworth Band
 Leftover Salmon
 Lettuce
 Liquid Stranger
 Los Lobos
 Marco Benevento
 The Motet
 Ookay Live
 Opiuo
 Papadosio
 Pigeons Playing Ping Pong
 Soja
 Spafford
 Tokimonsta
 Twiddle
 Victor Wooten Trio featuring Dennis Chambers & Bob Franceschini
 Yonder Mountain String Band
 Z-Trip
 Zomboy
 Aqueous
 Big Something
 Brandon "Taz" Niederauer
 Break Science
 Chicago Farmer
 Cofresi
 The Commonheart
 Con Brio
 Dirt Monkey
 Ducky
 Eliot Lipp
 Family and Friends
 Filibusta
 Fre3kbass and the Bump Assembly featuring Sammi Garett of Turkuaz
 The Funk Hunters
 Future Rock
 GG Magree
 Graves
 Henhouse Prowlers
 Horseshoes & Hand Grenades
 Jade Cicada
 Jason Huber DJ Set
 Joe Hertler & The Rainbow Seekers
 Joe Marcinek Band
 Kung Fu
 Kuuro
 Lawrence
 Led Zeppelin 2
 Lee DeWyze
 Mad Zach
 Maddy O'Neal
 The Main Squeeze
 Marvel Years
 Michael Menert & the Pretty Fantastics
 Mija
 Mike Dillon's Punk Rock Percussion Consortium
 Monophonics
 Nikki Lane
 Old Salt Union
 Old Shoe
 Parker
 Parsonsfield
 Pink Talking Fish
 Probcause
 Protoje
 Reo Cragun
 Roosevelt Collier
 Shlump
 SoDown
 Split Lip Rayfield
 Steady Flow
 Subtronics
 Sun Stereo
 Tauk
 Tyler Childers
 The Werks
 Zeke Beats
 Zoogma

2020
Officials decided to cancel this year's festival due to the COVID-19 pandemic. The 20th festival was deferred to August 2021.

See also

List of jam band music festivals

References

External links
 Summer Camp Music Festival — official website
 Soulpatch — official website

Chillicothe, Illinois
Music festivals in Illinois
Music festivals established in 2001
Rock festivals in the United States
Tourist attractions in Peoria County, Illinois
Jam band festivals